El Khoubna (also written El Khobna) is a village in the commune of Taibet, in Taibet District, Ouargla Province, Algeria.

References

Neighbouring towns and cities

Populated places in Ouargla Province